"One Minute" is a song by American rapper XXXTentacion featuring fellow American rapper Kanye West and  American musician Travis Barker from the former's third studio album, Skins (2018) The music video was released on December 7, 2018, coinciding with the release of Skins.

Reception
Controversy arose from West's lyrics: "Now your name is tainted, by the claims they paintin'/The defendant is guilty, no one blames the plaintiff", since they were viewed as victim blaming referring to XXXTentacion's charges of domestic abuse, which were dismissed after he was murdered. A source close to West reported to Billboard that he: "is not defending XXX or referencing anyone in particular". Throughout West's verse, he raps about the court of public opinion.

Music
"One Minute" is described as "nu-metal track" by Vulture and a rap-rock frenzy by Pitchfork, as well as a "post-punk screamo frenzy" by HotNewHipHop.

Music video
The music video was released on December 7, 2018, as the first video for a song from Skins, but later removed from Vimeo. It uses raunchy animations to show large-busted women, aggressive scenes of violence, and depictions of the angsty lyrical content. JJ Villard provided the explicit animation for the music video. It was shown at the Skins Release Party when Kanye made his surprise appearance.

Commercial performance
"One Minute" debuted at number 62 on the US Billboard Hot 100 upon the release of the album. It debuted at a similar position of number 69 on the Canadian Hot 100 in the same week.

Personnel
Credits adapted from Tidal.

 XXXTentacion – primary artist, composer, producer
 Kanye West – composer, featured artist
 Travis Barker – composer, drums
 John Cunningham – composer, producer
 Koen Heldens – mixing
 Brandon Brown – mixing assistant
 Dave Kutch – mastering
 Kevin Peterson – mastering assistant

Charts

References

External links
 

2018 songs
XXXTentacion songs
Kanye West songs
Travis Barker songs
Obscenity controversies in music
Nu metal songs
Rap rock songs
Songs released posthumously
Songs written by Kanye West
Songs written by Travis Barker
Songs written by XXXTentacion
Screamo songs
Post-punk songs